Austin J. Rogers (born 10 August 1995) is an American professional soccer player who plays as a goalkeeper for San Diego 1904 in the National Independent Soccer Association. His father, Glenn Rogers, also played professionally, most notably for the Portland Timbers.

Club career
In February 2015, Rogers signed for Premier Development League team Kitsap Pumas, after several weeks on trial at PAOK did not yield a first team contract. He would make several appearances in friendly games, however failed to make a competitive debut. Initially re-singing with the club for the 2016 season, his contract was voided due to the restructuring of the league.

At the start of 2016, Rogers moved to Albanian First Division team Besa Kavajë, where he would appear in 12 of the remaining 14 matches. His first game was a home fixture against  KS Iliria, it ended in a 1–1 draw. He would appear on Top Channel to discuss his recent success at his new club, as well as his transition to the Albanian lifestyle. On May 5, 2016 his contract was terminated by mutual consent.

In May 2016, Rogers moved to the Mongolian Premier League with Bayangol FC. On June 11, 2016 Austin was selected to the leagues All-Star team. However Rogers's stay was short lived, his contract was canceled by mutual consent after the conclusion of the season's 1st leg.

In February 2017 Rogers agreed to a seven-month contract with FC Ulaanbaatar. Once again joining the Mongolian Premier league. His Debut came as an away fixture against Ulaanbaatar City resulting in a 3–1 loss. On June 27, 2017, he was again selected to the leagues All-Star team. On September 30, 2017, Rogers received the "Goalkeeper of the Year" award; given by the Mongolian Football Federation. He was the first foreign player to ever receive the goalkeeping honor from the federation. He finished the season playing all 23 games, including cup fixtures. Which earned him a silver medal in the MFF Cup, once again losing Ulaanbaatar City, this time in the final.

On March 31, 2018 it was confirmed that Rogers had joined Ulaanbaatar City FC on a free transfer. It was reported “Rogers, formerly of Bayangol FC and FC Ulaanbaatar, will likely be Ulaanbaatar City FC's new #1 following Mauro Boerchio’s recent departure.”

On February 13, 2019 Rogers signed with Romanian side ACS Dacia Unirea Brăila, 19th of 20 at the end of the first part of the 2018–19 Liga II season.

References

External links

1995 births
Living people
Soccer players from Portland, Oregon
American soccer players
Association football goalkeepers
Besa Kavajë players
FC Ulaanbaatar players
Ulaanbaatar City FC players
AFC Dacia Unirea Brăila players
KF Tërbuni Pukë players
Detroit City FC players
Kategoria e Parë players
Mongolian National Premier League players
Liga II players
National Independent Soccer Association players
American expatriate soccer players
American expatriate sportspeople in Albania
Expatriate footballers in Albania
American expatriate sportspeople in Mongolia
Expatriate footballers in Mongolia
American expatriate sportspeople in Romania
Expatriate footballers in Romania
Expatriate footballers in Kosovo
American expatriate sportspeople in Kosovo